Chlorobenzoic acid  may refer to:
 2-Chlorobenzoic acid
 3-Chlorobenzoic acid 
 4-Chlorobenzoic acid